Connor Kirby-Long (born July 24, 1986) is an American electronic musician from Saint Johnsbury, Vermont who releases music under the name Khonnor. He has published works under several other names, including Grandma, and I, Cactus.

He used low-tech instruments such as a cheap microphone and an old computer, an amp, a guitar, and experimental electronics in his recording Handwriting. In the beginning of 2020, Weirdsound.net published an article stating that Connor Kirby-Long would return with a new album under the moniker "CCLCNG". The album, called Niagara Falls, is available for download on Bandcamp.

Discography

Albums 
 Handwriting (2004)
As CCLCNG

 Niagara Falls (2020)

EPs 
As I, Cactus
 I, Cactus (2003)
As Grandma
 Spinach Gas Room Spaghetti Straps (2002)
 Bopping Around In A Skin Car (2002)
 For Your Broken Heart (2003)
 Tiny Fashion (2005)
As Clown Connecktion
 I Scribble Out Music With My Left Hand EP (2003)
As Khonnor
 Lost Pets (2003)
 Live from Saint Johnsbury, Vermont (2004)
 Softbo EP (2008)
As Connor Long
 Live At The O Patro Vys (2008)
As Gaza Faggot
 Welcome To Softbo (2006)
As Jimmy Buffer
 Songs That Suck (2009)

Singles 
As I, Cactus
 I Gave You Fleas (2010)
 China Shipping Co. (2010)
As Khonnor
 Burning Palace (2006)
 U (Remix) (2010)

Contributions 
As Khonnor & This Instrument
 Mrs. Anatomy on Soulseek Compilation 001 (2003)
As Grandma
 Holy Moon on L'Arbre D'Un Train (2005)
As Stretch MC's
 Lil Jon Vs. Stretch MC's on Can Buy Me Love 2 (2006)
As Khonnor
 Blindness Bats on Retork (2003)
 Featured on Itadaki Street on Now You're Playing With Powar V: The Arc Of Powar (2005)
 Rectum Sanctum on Can Buy Me Love IV (2007)
 Walking on Moonlight ringtone for Mobile Vomit (2008)
 Hard Boiled Egg Day for Apegenine Vol. 2 - Hypocondriac (2009)

References

External links 
 Review of Handwriting in the University of Notre Dame Observer
 Review of Handwriting at Pitchfork Media
 Andres Lokko on making the Khonnor This is our music documentary. MTV This Is Our Music

1986 births
Folktronica musicians
Intelligent dance musicians
Living people
St. Johnsbury Academy alumni
People from St. Johnsbury, Vermont
Musicians from Vermont